Colonel Charles Fairlie Dobbs CIE CBE DSO (1 July 1872 – 27 December 1936) was a British Indian Army officer.

Dobbs was the son of Colonel A. F. Dobbs, also of the Indian Army. He was educated at Bedford School and then obtained a commission in a militia battalion, the 4th Battalion, Royal Irish Rifles, in January 1891. He resigned his commission in March 1891 to attend the Royal Military College, Sandhurst, and was commissioned second lieutenant into the Lancashire Fusiliers in June 1892. In October 1894 he transferred to the Indian Army and joined the 95th Russell's Infantry (later 94th Russell's Infantry). He was promoted captain in July 1901. He served in Aden from 1903 to 1904 and graduated from the Indian Staff College at Quetta in 1908. He was appointed brigade major in May 1909, actually promoted major in June 1910, and from July 1911 to June 1913 served as a brigade staff officer.

During the First World War, Dobbs served in the East Africa Campaign as assistant quartermaster-general, for which he was mentioned in dispatches three times, promoted temporary lieutenant-colonel in November 1915 and brevet lieutenant-colonel in January 1916, and awarded the Distinguished Service Order (DSO) in February 1917 and the Russian Order of St Anna 3rd Class. Promoted substantive lieutenant-colonel in 1917, he took command of his regiment until 1921, commanding it with the Bushire Field Force in Persia in 1918–1919, for which he was again mentioned in despatches and appointed Companion of the Order of the Indian Empire (CIE) in January 1920, in the Third Anglo-Afghan War in 1919, for which he was mentioned for the fifth time and appointed Commander of the Order of the British Empire (CBE) in August 1920, and in Mesopotamia in 1920. In October 1919 he was given the temporary rank of brigadier-general. He retired with the rank of colonel in October 1921.

Dobbs married Margaret Eleanor Jopp. They had one son and two daughters.

Footnotes

1872 births
1936 deaths
British Indian Army generals
People educated at Bedford School
Graduates of the Royal Military College, Sandhurst
Lancashire Fusiliers officers
Indian Army personnel of World War I
British military personnel of the Third Anglo-Afghan War
Companions of the Distinguished Service Order
Companions of the Order of the Indian Empire
Commanders of the Order of the British Empire